Walter Walker may refer to:

 Walter Walker (politician), United States Senator from Colorado
 Walter Walker (British Army officer), British general
 Walter M. Walker, pioneer of the U.S. state of Oregon
 Walt Walker, Major League Baseball player
 Wally Walker, American basketball player
 Walter Walker (actor) (1864–1947), American actor